Richard Hugh "Rick" Allert AO is an Australian businessman who was chair of Tourism Australia from 2007 to 2012.

Before this, he worked with Carroll Winter & Co Chartered Accountants from 1959 to 1960, and then with Peat Marwick Mitchell & Company from 1960; he was a partner with them from 1973 to 1979. He was a senior partner of Allert Heard & Co Chartered Accountants (1979–89) until it was acquired by the then Arthur Andersen & Co in 1989.

He was chair of Southcorp (1989–2002). In 1995, he was appointed a director of Coles Myer. He was chair of Coles Myer from 2002 until it was acquired by Wesfarmers in 2007. Allert is also chair of AXA Asia Pacific Holdings Ltd, Voyages Hotels & Resorts Pty Ltd and a Director of the Australia Business Arts Foundation.

He was appointed a Member of the Order of Australia (AM) in 1997, an Honorary Doctor of the University of South Australia in 2000, awarded the Centenary Medal in 2001, and was appointed an Officer of the Order of Australia (AO) in 2008.

Director list
Northern Territory Development Corporation
Northern Territory Trade Development Zone
South Australian Oil & Gas Corporation

Chairman list
Chairman of the National Mutual Life Association Ltd. (NMLA)
Chairman of the Aboriginal Foundation of South Australia Inc. 
Chairman of the Western Desert Resources Ltd.
• Chairman of the James Morrison Academy of Music

Charity positions
Duke of Edinburgh’s Award Scheme (SA)
National President of the National Heart Foundation of Australia
Chairman Pembroke School Foundation
Deputy Chairman of the Adelaide Football Club Ltd.

Awards
In 2011, Rick Allert was the recipient of The Ernst & Young Champion of Entrepreneurship Award, Central Region.  This award is given to those individuals "with a long-term record of outstanding entrepreneurial achievement, who have driven the growth of an Australian company, or companies over a sustained period of time and made a significant contribution to their community."

Other positions
Commissioner of the South Australian Health Commission
Deputy Chairman of the South Australian Development Council
Chairman of AustralAsia Railway Corporation
Chairman of the National Wine Centre
Member of the Singapore Australia Business Alliance Forum

References

External links
Review of Business Taxation: 

Australian accountants
Living people
People educated at Pembroke School, Adelaide
Officers of the Order of Australia
Recipients of the Centenary Medal
Year of birth missing (living people)